Ramillies may refer to:

 Ramillies, Belgium, municipality in Walloon Brabant 
 Ramillies, Nord, commune in France
 Battle of Ramillies, fought in 1706 at Ramillies, Belgium
 HMS Ramillies, several vessels of the Royal Navy named after the battle
 Ramillies-class ship of the line, a class of nine 74-gun third rates, after the 1763 HMS Ramillies